Rum Pond is the larger and eastern of two closely spaced frozen ponds in the floor of Alatna Valley, Convoy Range, in Victoria Land. The name is one of a group in Convoy Range reflecting a nautical theme. Named after this traditional naval beverage by a 1989-90 New Zealand Antarctic Research Program (NZARP) field party.
 

Lakes of Victoria Land
Scott Coast